Dawn is an upcoming American drama television film based on the with the same name by V. C. Andrews and directed by Linda-Lisa Hayter. The film stars Brec Bassinger as Dawn Longchamp and Donna Mills as her wicked grandmother Lillian Cutler. The film will debut on Lifetime in 2023.

Cast
 Brec Bassinger as Dawn Longchamp aka Eugenia Grace Cutler
 Donna Mills as Lillian Cutler
 Fran Drescher as Agnes Morris
 Joey McIntyre as Michael Sutton
 Jesse Metcalfe as Ormand Longchamp
 Khobe Clarke as Jimmy Longchamp
 Jason Cermak as Randolph Cutler
 Miranda Frigon as Laura Jean Cutler
 Elyse Maloway as Clara Jean Cutler 
 Dane Schioler as Philip Cutler
 Corey Woods as Tricia
 Helena Marie as Sally Longchamp

Production
In September 15, 2022, it was reported that Lifetime and A+E will produce V.C. Andrews's Dawn film series for airing in 2023. It produced by VC Secrets Productions with Merideth Finn and Michele Weiss who also executive produced Lifetime movies Flowers in the Attic and Petals on the Wind. For the leading roles was cast Brec Bassinger as Dawn and Donna Mills as her wicked grandmother Lillian Cutler. Fran Drescher, Joey McIntyre, Jesse Metcalfe, Khobe Clarke, Jason Cermak, Miranda Frigon, Elyse Maloway, Dane Schioler, Corey Woods and Helena Marie round out cast.

References

External links

Upcoming English-language films
Upcoming television films
Films shot in Vancouver
Lifetime (TV network) films
2023 television films
American psychological horror films